Trains to Life – Trains to Death is a 2.25 meter outdoor bronze sculpture by architect and sculptor Frank Meisler, installed outside the Friedrichstraße station at the intersection of Georgenstraße and Friedrichstraße, in Berlin, Germany. It is the second in a series of so far five installations also on display near train stations in London, Hamburg, Gdańsk and Hook of Holland.

The sculpture depicts two groups of children. One group is a pair of children symbolizing those saved by the Kindertransport, which brought 10,000 Jewish children from soon-to-be Nazi-occupied countries in Eastern Europe to safety in the United Kingdom and other countries. The other group consists of five children, who represent the 1,600,000 Jewish and non-Jewish children brought by Holocaust trains to the concentration camps and later killed there. Meisler himself was among those saved by the Kindertransport.

See also
 Children in the Holocaust
 Holocaust trains
 Kindertransport – The Arrival (2003), London

References

External links

 Kindertransport Sculptures at Frank Meisler's official website

Bronze sculptures in Germany
Buildings and structures in Mitte
Monuments and memorials to the victims of Nazism in Berlin
Outdoor sculptures in Berlin
Statues in Germany